Marcos André Costa Valente (born 4 February 1994) is a Portuguese professional footballer who plays as a centre-back for C.D. Trofense.

Club career
Born in Penafiel, Valente had two youth spells at local club F.C. Penafiel, the last starting at the age of 14. On 17 February 2013, while still a junior, he first appeared in a Segunda Liga game, playing the full 90 minutes in a 0–0 away draw against C.D. Feirense.

In June 2013, Valente joined S.L. Benfica on a five-year contract, being assigned to the reserve team who also competed in the second tier. He played 37 matches in his second season, scoring his first league goal on 17 August 2014 in the 2–1 away loss to Leixões SC; additionally, in 2015–16, he served a loan at C.D. Aves in the same league.

Valente signed a permanent deal with Vitória S.C. on 1 July 2016. His maiden appearance in the Primeira Liga took place on 19 August of the following year, when he started in a 0–5 home defeat against Sporting CP.

Club statistics

References

External links

1994 births
Living people
People from Penafiel
Sportspeople from Porto District
Portuguese footballers
Association football defenders
Primeira Liga players
Liga Portugal 2 players
F.C. Penafiel players
S.L. Benfica B players
C.D. Aves players
Vitória S.C. B players
Vitória S.C. players
F.C. Paços de Ferreira players
G.D. Estoril Praia players
C.D. Trofense players
U.D. Vilafranquense players